Henry Boteler (fl. 1386–1397), of Horsham, Sussex, was an English politician.

He was a Member (MP) of the Parliament of England for Lancashire in 1386, January 1390, 1391, 1395 and September 1397.

References

Year of birth missing
Year of death missing
English MPs 1386
English MPs January 1390
English MPs 1391
English MPs 1395
English MPs September 1397
14th-century English politicians
People from Horsham